Mesin may refer to:
 Měšín, Czech Republic
 Mesin, Iran